Ralph M. Calhoun Memorial Airport  is a state-owned public-use airport located one nautical mile (1.85 km) west of the central business district of Tanana, a city in the Yukon-Koyukuk Census Area of the U.S. state of Alaska.

As per Federal Aviation Administration records, the airport had 3,549 passenger boardings (enplanements) in calendar year 2008, 3,298 enplanements in 2009, and 3,241 in 2010. It is included in the National Plan of Integrated Airport Systems for 2011–2015, which categorized it as a non-primary commercial service airport (between 2,500 and 10,000 enplanements per year).

Facilities and aircraft 
Ralph M. Calhoun Memorial Airport covers an area of 1,650 acres (668 ha) at an elevation of 236 feet (72 m) above mean sea level. It has one runway designated 7/25 with a gravel surface measuring 4,400 by 150 feet (1,341 x 46 m).

For the 12-month period ending September 29, 2009, the airport had 3,100 aircraft operations, an average of 258 per month: 55% general aviation, 43% air taxi, and 2% military.

Airlines and destinations 

The following airlines offer scheduled passenger service at this airport:

References

External links 
 Topographic map from USGS The National Map
 FAA Alaska airport diagram (GIF)
 

Airports in the Yukon–Koyukuk Census Area, Alaska